Kristina Ranudd (born 14 October 1962) is a Swedish former cyclist. She competed in the women's road race event at the 1984 Summer Olympics.

References

External links
 

1962 births
Living people
Swedish female cyclists
Olympic cyclists of Sweden
Cyclists at the 1984 Summer Olympics
Sportspeople from Uppsala
20th-century Swedish women
21st-century Swedish women